Demetrius is the Latinized form of the Ancient Greek male given name Dēmḗtrios, meaning “Demetris” - "devoted to goddess Demeter". 
Alternate forms include Demetrios, Dimitrios, Dimitris, Dmytro, Dimitri, Dimitrie, Dimitar, Dumitru, Demitri, Dhimitër, and Dimitrije, in addition to other forms (such as Russian Dmitry) descended from it.

Demetrius and its variations may refer to the following:

Demetrius of Alopece (4th century BC), Greek sculptor noted for his realism
Demetrius of Phalerum ( –  BC)
Demetrius, somatophylax of Alexander the Great (d. 330 BC)
Demetrius - brother of Antigonus I Monophthalmus, king of Macedonia 306-301 BC
Demetrius I of Macedon (337–283 BC), called Poliorcetes, son of Antigonus I Monophthalmus, King of Macedonia 294–288 BC
Demetrius the Fair (Demetrius the Handsome, Demetrius of Cyrene) (285 BC-249/250 BC) - Hellenistic king of Cyrene
Demetrius II Aetolicus, son of Antigonus II, King of Macedonia 239–229 BC
Demetrius, son of Philip V of Macedon
Demetrius of Pharos - ruler of Pharos c. 222 – 219 BC, involved in the First Illyrian War
Demetrius the Chronographer (late 3rd century BC), Jewish chronicler (historian)
Demetrius I Soter (185–150 BC), king of Syria
Demetrius I of Bactria (d. 180 BC), Greek king of Bactria
Demetrius II of India  (fl. early 2nd century BC), possible relative of the above
Demetrius II Nicator (d. 125 BC), son of Demetrius I Soter
Demetrius III Aniketos, Indo-Greek king  BC
Demetrius III Eucaerus (d. 88 BC), son of Antiochus VIII Grypus, Seleucid King
Demetrius the Cynic (1st century), Cynic philosopher
Pope Demetrius I of Alexandria, ruled in 189–232
Demetrius of Thessaloniki (died 306), Christian martyr and saint
 Demetrius of Bulgaria was the second Patriarch of the Bulgarian Orthodox Church between c. 927 and c. 930, and the first one to have been recognized by the Ecumenical Patriarch of Constantinople
Demetrius Zvonimir (died 1089), King of Croatia 1075–1089
Demetrius I of Georgia, son of David IV of Georgia the Great, (1125–1156)
Dhimitër Progoni (1208-1216), medieval Albanian prince
Dmitry Donskoy (1350–1389), Russian prince
Pseudo-Demetrius I, also known as False Dmitry I, Tsar of Russia, ruled 1605–1606
Demetrius the Neomartyr (1779–1803), Orthodox Christian martyr and saint
Pope Demetrius II of Alexandria, ruled in 1861–1870
Demetrius Stefanovich Schilizzi (1839–1893)
Demetriu Radu (1861–1920), Romanian Greek Catholic bishop
Dmitri Mendeleev (1834–1907), Russian chemist, creator of the first periodic table
Hadzhi Dimitar (Dimitar Nikolov Asenov) (10 May 1840 – 10 August 1868), prominent Bulgarian voivode and revolutionary
Dmitri Shostakovich (1906–1975), Russian composer
Demetrios Trakatellis (born 1928), Greek Orthodox Archbishop of America and Exarch of the Atlantic and Pacific Oceans. In office since 1999.
Dmitry Medvedev (born 1965), Prime Minister of Russia
Dimitrije Avramović, Serbian painter
Dimitrije Bašičević, Serbian painter
Dimitri Davidović, Serbian footballer
Demetri Martin, American comedian
Demetri McCamey, American basketball player
Dimitri Kitsikis, Greek geopolitician
Dimitrije Banjac, Serbian actor
Dimitrios Salpingidis, Greek footballer
Dimitrios Papadopoulos, Greek footballer
Dimitar Berbatov, Bulgarian footballer
Dimitrije Injac, Serbian footballer
Demetrious Johnson (born 1986), American mixed martial arts fighter
Dimitrij Kotschnew
Dimitrije T. Leko, Serbian architect
Dimitrije Ljotić, Serbian politician
Dimitrij Nonin
Dimitrije Pejanović, Serbian handballer
Dimitrije Mitrinović, Serbian writer
Dimitri Nanopoulos, Greek physicist
Dositej Obradović, Serbian writer
Demetrius Rhaney (born 1992), American football player
Dimitrij Rupel
Dimitrije Ruvarac, Serbian writer
Serbian Patriarch Dimitrije of the Serbian Orthodox Church
Dimitrios Siovas, Greek footballer
Dome Sztojay, Serbian politician
Demetrius Treadwell (born 1991), American basketball player for Hapoel Gilboa Galil of the Israeli League Liga Leumit
Dimitrije Tucović, Serbian politician
Lucia Demetrius, Romanian writer
Vasile Demetrius, Romanian writer

Fictional characters
Demetrius (Shakespeare), a main character in William Shakespeare's play, A Midsummer Night's Dream; Demetrius is also a villainous character in Shakespeare's revenge tragedy, Titus Andronicus
Demetrius, a character in Mira Nair's Mississippi Masala
Demetrius, a Greek slave in the Lloyd C. Douglas Christian novel The Robe and its film sequel below 
Demetrius and the Gladiators, a 1953 20th Century Fox film
Demetrius, one of the Titans in the two-part Charmed episode "Oh My Goddess!"
Demetrios, a character in The Young Indiana Jones Chronicles 
Demetri, a fictional character in the Twilight fantasy series
Demitri Maximoff, a vampire from the Capcom video game series Darkstalkers
Dmitri Kissoff, a character in Stanley Kubrick's Dr. Strangelove or How I Learned to Stop Worrying and Love the Bomb
Dimitri Petrenko, a character in the first-person shooter Call of Duty: World at War

In other languages

 (Źmicier, Dz'mitry)
 (Dimitar)

Modern  (Dimitris, Dimitrios, Mitros, Mitsos, Mitsaras, Jimmy)

 (Dmitriy, Mitja)

 (Dmytro)
Serbian: Димитрије (Dimitrije), Дмитар (Dmitar), Митар (Mitar)
Croatian:Dmitar

References
Demetrius Dictionary of Greek and Roman Biography and Mythology

Given names of Greek language origin
Greek masculine given names
English masculine given names
Theophoric names
Demeter